Gjerstad is a village in Osterøy municipality in Vestland county, Norway. The village is located in the central part of the island of Osterøy, just north of the village of Austbygdi. Gjerstad Church is located in this village, serving the central part of the island.

References

Villages in Vestland
Osterøy